The canton of Pont-de-Vaux is a former administrative division in eastern France. It was disbanded following the French canton reorganisation which came into effect in March 2015. It consisted of 12 communes, which joined the new canton of Replonges in 2015. It had 9,992 inhabitants (2012).

The canton comprised 12 communes:

Arbigny
Boissey
Boz
Chavannes-sur-Reyssouze
Chevroux
Gorrevod
Ozan
Pont-de-Vaux
Reyssouze
Saint-Bénigne
Saint-Étienne-sur-Reyssouze
Sermoyer

Demographics

See also
Cantons of the Ain department

References

Former cantons of Ain
2015 disestablishments in France
States and territories disestablished in 2015